Jan Carlos Hurtado Anchico (born 5 March 2000) is a Venezuelan professional footballer  who plays as a forward for Campeonato Brasileiro Série A club Red Bull Bragantino on loan from Argentine Primera División side Boca Juniors.

Club career

Deportivo Táchira

Gimnasia y Esgrima

Boca Juniors
On 12 July 2019 Argentine Primera División club Boca Juniors signed Hurtado from Gimnasia y Esgrima on a US$5m transfer fee.

Red Bull Bragantino (loan)
On 10 August 2020, Hurtado joined Campeonato Brasileiro Série A side Red Bull Bragantino on a one-year loan deal. On 11 July 2021 Hurtado extended his loan contract with Red Bull Bragantino until 31 July 2022.

International career
Hurtado was called up to the Venezuela under-20 side for the 2017 FIFA U-20 World Cup. He scored the sixth goal in his side's 7–0 victory over Vanuatu. He made his Venezuela national team debut on 22 March 2019 against Argentina coming in the 89th minute as a substitute for Jhon Murillo.

Career statistics

Club

Notes

International

Honours

Club
Boca Juniors
Primera División: 2019–20

International
Venezuela
FIFA U-20 World Cup: Runner-up 2017

References

2000 births
Living people
Venezuelan footballers
Venezuela international footballers
Association football forwards
Deportivo Táchira F.C. players
Venezuelan Primera División players
Club de Gimnasia y Esgrima La Plata footballers
Boca Juniors footballers
Red Bull Bragantino players
Campeonato Brasileiro Série A players
Argentine Primera División players
2021 Copa América players
Expatriate footballers in Argentina
Expatriate footballers in Brazil
People from Barinas (state)
Venezuela under-20 international footballers
Venezuela youth international footballers
21st-century Venezuelan people